A Lariat chain is a loop of chain that hangs off, and is spun by a wheel. It is often used as a science exhibit or a toy. 

The original Lariat Chain was created in 1986 by Norman Tuck, as an Artist-in-Residence project at the Exploratorium in San Francisco. 

Lariat Chain was developed from an earlier Tuck piece entitled Chain Reaction (1984). Chain Reaction was hand cranked, and utilized a heavy chain attached by magnets onto an iron flywheel. As in Lariat Chain, Chain Reaction used a brush to disrupt the motion of the traveling chain.  

The speed of the chain is arranged to equal the wave speed of transverse waves, so that waves moving against the motion of the chain appear to be standing still.

See also
Belt (mechanical)
Foucault pendulum
Launch loop has similar potential instabilities

References

External links

Coilgun info: Lariat Chain Introduction
Kinetic Chain sculpture built from a bicycle
Instructables how-to
Simulation of a Lariat chain

Physics experiments